Hunza may refer to:

 Hunza, Iran
 Hunza Valley, an area in the Gilgit-Baltistan region of Pakistan
 Hunza (princely state), a former principality
 Hunza District, a recently established district
 Hunza River, a waterway
 Hunza Peak, a mountain 
 Hunza people, also known as Burusho, the inhabitants of the valley
 Hunza, a variety of the Burushaski language
 Upper Hunza, another name for Gojal, a valley situated in the far north of Pakistan
 Shinaki, the inhabitants of Lower Hunza
 Tunja, a city in Colombia

See also
 Hanza (disambiguation)
Naltar Valley